Kiddie Kure is a 1940 American short comedy film directed by Edward Cahn. It was the 194th Our Gang short (195th episode, 106th talking short, 107th talking episode, and 26th MGM produced episode) that was released.

Plot
While playing baseball near the home of wealthy hypochondriac Mr. Morton, the gang inadvertently breaks one of Morton's windows. This mishap coincides with a plan hatched by Morton's wife to get her husband's mind off his imaginary illnesses by adopting some children.

Hoping to prove that he would be an unsuitable parent, Morton pretends that he is crazy, the better to scare away the gang and to dissuade Mrs. Morton from her adoption scheme. Instead, the kids prove to Morton that he does not need all his pills and poultices, thereby giving the old man a new lease on life and a better appreciation of children.

Cast

The Gang
 Darla Hood as Darla
 Mickey Gubitosi as Mickey
 Billy Laughlin as Froggy
 George McFarland as Spanky
 Carl Switzer as Alfalfa
 Billie Thomas as Buckwheat

Additional cast
 Rollie and Bobby Jones as Tisket and Tasket
 Thurston Hall as Mr. Bill Morton
 Gerald Oliver Smith as Evans the butler
 Edwin Stanley as Doctor Malcolm Scott
 Josephine Whittel as Mrs. Julie Morton
 Freddie Chapman as Rival team member (scenes deleted)
 Hugh Chapman as Rival team member (scenes deleted)

Production notes
Kiddie Kure is a partial remake of Second Childhood, which starred much of the same cast. It also marked the final appearance of Carl "Alfalfa" Switzer. At 12 years of age, he was the oldest member of the cast.

See also
 Our Gang filmography

References

External links

1940 films
American black-and-white films
Films directed by Edward L. Cahn
Metro-Goldwyn-Mayer short films
1940 comedy films
Our Gang films
1940 short films
1940s American films
Films about hypochondriasis